Cache Hill is a cinder cone in northern British Columbia, Canada. It is thought to have last erupted in the Holocene period.  Once used as an airdrop for food and supplies by the Geophysical Survey of Canada, hence its name, it is located north of Raspberry Pass in Mount Edziza Provincial Park.

See also
List of volcanoes in Canada
List of Northern Cordilleran volcanoes
Volcanism of Canada
Volcanism of Western Canada

References

Cinder cones of British Columbia
Holocene volcanoes
Monogenetic cinder cones
Mount Edziza volcanic complex
Hills of British Columbia
Two-thousanders of British Columbia